Ron Moore is largely credited, along with George Olson and Bill Lee, to
have given rise to the modern ULDB, or ultralight displacement boat. 
This yacht type revolutionized sailing as the modern world knows it, especially
in downwind races as are common on California's West Coast.

The prototype for the Moore 24 Grendel was built by George Olson is his backyard in 1968. She measured 24' long and weighed just
over 2000 lbs., less than half of what similar length sailboats in the
marketplace displaced. The next development was Summertime which with various tweaks
which became known as the Ultimate Wednesday Night Boat and proved itself
repeatedly on the racecourse. The subsequent molds were taken from Summertime,
and the production Moore 24 was born. Mr. Moore's famous boatyard was known as
"the Reef" off of Soquel Ave. in Santa Cruz. 

Through a long and storied career in boatbuilding, Ron and his wife Martha
ran a boatyard that embodied the California Lifestyle, complete with barbecues
and a hot tub. Sailing ULDBs required agile, athletic sailors that 
would shun creature comforts in favor of high performance surfing on
big waves in windy conditions. Really outstanding Moore 24 sailors like Will Baylis,
John Kostecki, Morgan Larson, and others have gone on to achieve the highest
levels in world championship sailing and the America's Cup.

Others Moore 24 sailors like Dave Hodges and Jim Maloney, have also achieved tremendous 
highs in class performance, and have been active at the grass roots level of the class.
They can be often be seen in the hazy fog enveloping the Santa Cruz harbor or torching
up the San Francisco Bay on a wild broad reach off of Pt. Blunt. 
As new fleets and sailors have mushroomed up around the world, Moore has
continually set the Santa Cruz tone of the class so often espoused by Bill Lee: "Fast is Fun".

The Moores realised the diversity and excellence of the core sailing
group in the Moore 24 class and supported the community at a grass roots level.

References 

American boat builders
Possibly living people
Year of birth missing